The great auricular nerve is a cutaneous nerve of the head. It originates from the cervical plexus, with branches of spinal nerves C2 and C3. It provides sensory innervation to the skin over the parotid gland and the mastoid process of the temporal bone, and surfaces of the outer ear.

Pain resulting from parotitis is caused by an impingement on the great auricular nerve.

Structure 
The great auricular nerve is the largest of the ascending branches of the cervical plexus.

Origin 
It arises from the second and third cervical nerves (C2-C3).

Course and relations 
It winds around the posterior border of the sternocleidomastoid muscle, then perforates the deep fascia before ascending alongside the external jugular vein upon that sternocleidomastoid muscle beneath the platysma muscle to the parotid gland.

Fate 
Upon reaching the parotid gland, it divides into an anterior branch and a posterior branch.

Branches 
Anterior branch

The anterior branch (ramus anterior; facial branch) is distributed to the skin of the face over the parotid gland.

It communicates with the facial nerve inside the parotid gland.

Posterior branch

The posterior branch (ramus posterior; mastoid branch) innervates the skin over the mastoid process, on the back of the auricle (save for its upper part), of the lobule, and of the lower part of the concha.

The posterior branch communicates with the lesser occipital nerve, the auricular branch of the vagus, and the posterior auricular branch of the facial.

Distribution 
The great auricular nerve is distributed to the skin of the face over the parotid gland (anterior branch), skin over the mastoid process (posterior branch), and parts of the auricle (posterior branch).

Clinical significance 
The great auricular nerve may be damaged during surgery on the parotid gland, reducing sensation to the face.

Pain resulting from parotitis is caused by an impingement on the great auricular nerve.

The intermingling of the great auricular nerve and the facial nerve (CN VII) is thought to be responsible for the pathogenesis of Frey's syndrome following parotidectomy.

Additional images

References

External links 
 Diagram at aapmr.org
  - "Diagram of the cervical plexus."

Nerves of the head and neck